The Beggs Independent School District is a school district based in Beggs, Oklahoma, United States. It contains an elementary school, a middle school, and a high school. The district-wide mascot is the Golden Demons.

See also
 List of school districts in Oklahoma

References

External links
 Beggs School District
 Beggs Overview

School districts in Oklahoma
Education in Okmulgee County, Oklahoma